A drop-down list (abbreviated drop-down, or DDL; also known as a drop-down menu, drop menu, pull-down list, picklist) is a graphical control element, similar to a list box, that allows the user to choose one value from a list. When a drop-down list is inactive, it displays a single value. When activated, it displays (drops down) a list of values, from which the user may select one. When the user selects a new value, the control reverts to its inactive state, displaying the selected value. It is often used in the design of graphical user interfaces, including web design.

Terminology

This type of control is called a "pop-up menu" on the Macintosh platform; however, the term "popup menu" is used to refer to context menus in other GUI systems. The Macintosh also has the notion of "pull-down menus". The distinction is that, when the menu is closed, a pop-up menu's title shows the last-selected item while a pull-down menu shows a static title like a menu in the menu bar. Thus, the uses are different—popup menus are used to select a single option from a list while pull-down menus are used to issue commands or in cases where multiple options can be selected.

HTML

<select>
  <option>option1</option>
  <option>option2</option>
  <option>option3</option>
</select>

See also 
 Combo box
 List box

References

Graphical control elements